Oktyabrskoye is a rural locality (a village) in Tavtimanovsky Selsoviet, Iglinsky District, Bashkortostan, Russia. The population was 164 as of 2010. There are 3 streets.

Geography 
Oktyabrskoye is located 24 km northeast of Iglino (the district's administrative centre) by road. Klyuchevskoye is the nearest rural locality.

References 

Rural localities in Iglinsky District